Mohammad Jahurul Islam Omi (born 12 December 1986) is a Bangladeshi international cricketer. He played Test, One Day International and Twenty20 International cricket for Bangladesh between 2010 and 2013.

Career
Islam made his debut for Rajshahi Division in 2002/03 playing through the 2006/07 season.  He also played for Bangladesh A in 2004, scoring 87 against England A.  A right-handed batsman and occasional off-break bowler and wicket keeper.  He is sometimes referred to on scoresheets by his nickname Aumi. He has scored two first-class centuries for his state, with a best of 139 against Barisal Division.  He scored 71 against Dhaka Division in the one day game.

He was the leading run-scorer for Gazi Group Cricketers in the 2017–18 Dhaka Premier Division Cricket League, with 401 runs in 14 matches.

In October 2018, he was named in the squad for the Khulna Titans team, following the draft for the 2018–19 Bangladesh Premier League. He was the leading run-scorer for Abahani Limited in the 2018–19 Dhaka Premier Division Cricket League tournament, with 735 runs in 16 matches. In August 2019, he was one of 35 cricketers named in a training camp ahead of Bangladesh's 2019–20 season. In November 2019, he was selected to play for the Rangpur Rangers in the 2019–20 Bangladesh Premier League.

References

1986 births
Living people
Bangladeshi cricketers
Bangladesh Test cricketers
Bangladesh One Day International cricketers
Bangladesh Twenty20 International cricketers
Rajshahi Division cricketers
Rajshahi Royals cricketers
Chattogram Challengers cricketers
Abahani Limited cricketers
Rangpur Riders cricketers
Sheikh Jamal Dhanmondi Club cricketers
Legends of Rupganj cricketers
Mohammedan Sporting Club cricketers
Bangladesh North Zone cricketers
Dhaka Division cricketers
Gazi Group cricketers
Wicket-keepers
People from Rajshahi District